Michal Pančík (born 17 December 1971) is a Slovak international football midfielder who played for clubs in the former Czechoslovakia.

Career
Born in Brezno, Pančík began playing football for Inter Bratislava in the Czechoslovak First League. Later, he would make 76 appearances in the Czech first division for Baník Ostrava.

Pančík played for Slovakia at the 2000 Summer Olympics in Sydney. He also made one appearance for the senior Slovakia national football team during 2000.

External links
 

1971 births
Living people
Slovak footballers
Slovak football managers
Slovakia international footballers
Olympic footballers of Slovakia
Footballers at the 2000 Summer Olympics
Slovak expatriate footballers
Association football midfielders
FK Inter Bratislava players
FC VSS Košice players
FK Dukla Banská Bystrica players
ŠK Slovan Bratislava players
FK Železiarne Podbrezová players
FC Baník Ostrava players
FK Inter Bratislava managers
3. Liga (Slovakia) managers
Sportspeople from Brezno
Expatriate footballers in the Czech Republic
Slovak expatriate sportspeople in the Czech Republic